Springfield Township is one of the eleven townships of Lucas County, Ohio, United States. As of 2010, the total population was 26,193, making it the third most populous part of Lucas County, behind Toledo and Sylvania Township.

Geography
Located in the central part of the county, it borders the following townships and cities:
Sylvania Township - north
Toledo - east
Maumee - southeast
Monclova Township - south
Spencer Township - west

The village of Holland lies in eastern Springfield Township.

Name and history
Springfield Township was organized in 1836. It is one of eleven Springfield Townships statewide.

Schools
Springfield Local School District has four elementary schools, one middle school, and one high school. The schools are Holloway, Crissey, Dorr Elementary, and Holland Elementary Schools, Springfield Middle School, and Springfield High School. The mascot of Springfield High School is the "Blue Devil".  The district was rated "Excellent" by the Ohio Department of Education between 2008 and 2011.

Government

The township is governed by a three-member board of trustees, who are elected in November of odd-numbered years to a four-year term beginning on the following January 1. Two are elected in the year after the presidential election and one is elected in the year before it. There is also an elected township fiscal officer, who serves a four-year term beginning on April 1 of the year after the election, which is held in November of the year before the presidential election. Vacancies in the fiscal officership or on the board of trustees are filled by the remaining trustees.

Notable people
 Joe the Plumber (Samuel Joseph Wurzelbacher), a person brought to attention during the 2008 U.S presidential election campaign
 Rick Upchurch, wide receiver for the Denver Broncos 1975-1983

Transportation
The following highways are important transportation arteries in Springfield Township:

Interstate 475/U.S. Route 23 from Sylvania Township to Monclova Township
State Route 2 "Airport Highway" (Swanton Township to Toledo)

References

External links
Township website
County website
Holland Springfield Spencer Historical Society

Townships in Lucas County, Ohio
Townships in Ohio
1836 establishments in Ohio
Populated places established in 1836